The Speedway Helmet Race was an automobile race held at the Indianapolis Motor Speedway, during each of the three race weekends of 1910 (the last year prior to the first Indianapolis 500).  The trophy was a metal helmet, featuring the Speedway's "Wings and Wheel" logo, which the winner wore while defending his title in the next Speedway Helmet Race. The photo to the right is of auto racing star Johnny Aitken. He modeled the unique trophy in May 1910 just days before the first race in which it was the primary prize. He never won the award.

Race results

Sources

Scott, D. Bruce; INDY: Racing Before the 500; Indiana Reflections; 2005; .
Galpin, Darren;  A Record of Motorsport Racing Before World War I.
Dill, Mark, www.firstsuperspeedway.com (Photo and associated caption)

Auto races in the United States
Motorsport in Indianapolis
1910 in motorsport
1910 in American motorsport